John Lowrie may refer to:
 John Patrick Lowrie, American actor, musician and author
 John Cameron Lowrie, American Presbyterian missionary in India